Zelo Buon Persico is a comune (municipality) in the Province of Lodi in the Italian region Lombardy, located about  southeast of Milan and about  southeast of Lodi.

Zelo Buon Persico borders the following municipalities: Merlino, Paullo, Spino d'Adda, Mulazzano, Cervignano d'Adda, Boffalora d'Adda, Galgagnano.

References

Cities and towns in Lombardy